Eslamabad (also Romanized as Eslāmābād; also known as Dalmeh) is a village in Hasanlu Rural District, Mohammadyar District, Naqadeh County, West Azerbaijan Province, Iran. At the 2006 census, its population was 238, in 60 families.

References 

Populated places in Naqadeh County